Koppal (District)  is a District in the southern state of Karnataka, India.

Demographics
As of 2001 India census, Koppal (Rural) had a population of 12,584 with 6,383 males and 6,201 females.

See also
 Koppal
 Districts of Karnataka

References

External links
 https://web.archive.org/web/20190810051205/https://koppal.nic.in/

Villages in Koppal district